Lassana Diarra (born 29 December 1989) is a Malian professional footballer, who plays as a forward for Djoliba AC.

International career
In January 2014, coach Djibril Dramé, invited him to be a part of the Mali squad for the 2014 African Nations Championship. He helped the team to the quarter finals where they lost to Zimbabwe by two goals to one.

References

1989 births
Living people
Mali international footballers
Malian footballers
2014 African Nations Championship players
Association football forwards
Algerian Ligue Professionnelle 1 players
MC Alger players
Malian expatriate footballers
Malian expatriate sportspeople in Algeria
Expatriate footballers in Algeria
21st-century Malian people
Mali A' international footballers
Djoliba AC players